Acantholespesia comstocki is a species of bristle fly in the family Tachinidae. Its larval hosts are Hesperiidae, Megathymidae and Pyralidae families of butterflies.

Distribution
United States.

References

Taxa named by Samuel Wendell Williston
Diptera of North America
Exoristinae
Insects described in 1889